EFV may refer to:
 Expeditionary Fighting Vehicle, an amphibious assault vehicle developed by General Dynamics
 Equine foamy virus, virus in the genus Equispumavirus
 Ecole Française de Vilnius, a French international school in Vilnius, Lithuania
 Efavirenz, an antiretroviral medication used to treat and prevent HIV/AIDS